Kishoreganj Football Stadium (also known as Kishoreganj Old Stadium) is located by the Kishoreganj-Mymensingh Rd, Kishoreganj, Bangladesh.

See also
Stadiums in Bangladesh
List of cricket grounds in Bangladesh
Kishoreganj Cricket Stadium
Sheikh Kamal International Stadium, Cox's Bazar
Sheikh Kamal International Stadium, Gopalganj

References

Football venues in Bangladesh